Nebraska Highway 91 is a highway in central and eastern Nebraska.  Its western terminus is at an intersection with Nebraska Highway 2 north of Dunning.  Its eastern terminus is at an intersection with U.S. Highway 30 and U.S. Highway 75 in Blair.

Route description
Nebraska Highway 91 begins at an intersection with NE 2 just north of Dunning. It heads in a northeasterly direction through the Sand Hills, where it has an intersection with NE 7 south of Brewster. The highway continues to the east and southeast into farmland, heading into Taylor. In Taylor, NE 91 meets US 183 and runs concurrently southward with it for about a mile. NE 91 then splits off and head eastward, where it intersects with NE 11 south of Burwell. NE 91 and NE 11 run concurrently northward for a couple of miles as it passes through Burwell, before splitting off to head east again.

Further east, NE 91/NE 70 intersect with US 281, which is where the overlap with NE 70 ends.  NE 91 then runs concurrently southward.  NE 91 then splits off and head eastward some more, passing through Spalding.  After leaving Spalding, the highway passes NE 52.  To the east, it enters Albion where it intersects with NE 14.  Further east, it passes NE 45 before entering Lindsay.  NE 91 intersects US 81 northeast of Humphrey.  The highway continues to the east, where it passes NE 57 north of Leigh, as well as NE 15 southeast of Clarkson.

In Snyder, NE 91 passes by NE 79 before continuing eastward.  East of Snyder, it meets and runs concurrently southeastward with US 275.  After passing through Scribner and bypassing Hooper, NE 91/US 275 meet with US 77 and run concurrently southward along it as well.  North of Fremont, NE 91 splits off to the east yet again.  It continues eastward through Nickerson and continues into Blair, where it terminates at an intersection with US 30 and US 75.

Major intersections

References

External links

Nebraska Roads: NE 81-100

091
Transportation in Blaine County, Nebraska
Transportation in Loup County, Nebraska
Transportation in Garfield County, Nebraska
Transportation in Greeley County, Nebraska
Transportation in Boone County, Nebraska
Transportation in Platte County, Nebraska
Transportation in Colfax County, Nebraska
Transportation in Dodge County, Nebraska
Transportation in Washington County, Nebraska